Arborotites stuckenbergi is a species of ulidiid or picture-winged fly in the genus Arborotites of the family Ulidiidae.

Distribution
South Africa.

References

Ulidiidae
Diptera of Africa
Insects described in 2000